The Željeznica is a river in Bosnia and Herzegovina, which rises at the foot of the Treskavica Mountain. It has a number of rapids and whirlpools, including those of Turovi. Kazani is regarded the most attractive place in the canyon, where round hollows, "kettles", give the impression of boiling water. The kettles are about half to one meter deep and 0,30 to 0,70 cm wide in radius, and they are frequent in the riverbed.

The Željeznica river is one of the chief geographic features of the western Sarajevo field (Sarajevo polje). It flows through the municipalities Trnovo and Istočna Ilidža from south and eventually meets up with the Mala Bosna river, a stretch of the Bosna between its source at Vrelo Bosne and Željeznica confluence, all near Ilidža, Sarajevo. The Željeznica and the Mala Bosna form the Bosna.

The Željeznica river is the western boundary of Jahorina mountain. The archaeological site of Butmir is located on the right bank of the Željeznica river, relatively close to the source of the Bosna river. The terrace next to the Željeznica river was well suited to late Neolithic settlement.

The Željeznica is possibly among last remaining sanctuaries for huchen (Hucho hucho) in the Bosna river basin, others being the Krivaja, the Fojnica, and possibly the Lašva.

See also
Bosna

References

External links

Rivers of Bosnia and Herzegovina